The Philippines has five types of climates: tropical rainforest, tropical monsoon, tropical savanna, humid subtropical and oceanic (both are in higher-altitude areas) characterized by relatively high temperature, oppressive humidity and plenty of rainfall. There are two seasons in the country, the wet season and the dry season, based upon the amount of rainfall. This is also dependent on location in the country as some areas experience rain all throughout the year (see Climate types). Based on temperature, the warmest months of the year are March through October; the winter monsoon brings cooler air from November to February. May is the warmest month, and January, the coolest.

Weather in the Philippines is monitored and managed by the Philippine Atmospheric, Geophysical and Astronomical Services Administration (PAGASA).

Rainfall 
Monsoons are large-scale sea breezes which occur when the temperature on land is significantly warmer or cooler than the temperature of the ocean. Most summer monsoons or southwest monsoons have a dominant westerly component and a strong tendency to ascend and produce copious amounts of rain (because of the condensation of water vapor in the rising air). The intensity and duration, however, are not uniform from year to year. Winter monsoons or northeast monsoons, by contrast, have a dominant easterly component and a strong tendency to diverge, subside and cause drought.

The summer monsoon brings heavy rains to most of the archipelago from May to October. Monsoon rains, although hard and drenching, are not normally associated with high winds and waves.
   
At least 30 percent of the annual rainfall in the northern Philippines can be traced to tropical cyclones, while the southern islands receiving less than 10 percent of their annual rainfall from tropical cyclones. The wettest known tropical cyclone to impact the archipelago was the July 1911 cyclone, when the total precipitation for Baguio was distributed over the four days as: 14th – , 15th – , 16th – , 17th – ; followed by extraordinary drought from October 1911 to May 1912, so that the annual amount of those two years were hardly noticeable.

Typhoons 

The Philippines sit across the typhoon belt, making dangerous storms from July through October. Climate change exacerbates the situation with typhoons in the Philippines. Bagyo is the Filipino term for any tropical cyclone in the Philippine Islands.  From the statistics gathered by PAGASA from 1948 to 2004, around an average of 28 storms and/or typhoons per year enter the PAR (Philippine Area of Responsibility) – the designated area assigned to PAGASA to monitor during weather disturbances. Those that made landfall or crossed the Philippines, the average was nine per year. In 1993, a record 19 typhoons made landfall in the country making it the most in one year. The fewest per year were 4 during the years 1955, 1958, 1992, and 1997.

PAGASA categorises typhoons into five types according to wind speed. Once a tropical cyclone enters the PAR, regardless of strength, it is given a local name for identification purposes by the media, government, and the general public.

Public Storm Warning System (PSWS) 

Because of this, the Super Typhoon (STY) category with more than  maximum sustained winds was officially adopted. PAGASA revises definition of super typhoon, signal system in 2022. However, according to different stakeholders, the extensive and devastating damages caused by strong typhoons such as Typhoon Haiyan (Yolanda) in 2013 and Typhoon Rai (Odette) in 2021 made the fourlevel warning system inadequate.

Strongest typhoons

Typhoon Haiyan (Yolanda, 2013) 
The deadliest typhoon to impact the Philippines was Typhoon Haiyan, locally known as Yolanda, in November 2013, in which more than 6,300 people died from its storm surges and powerful winds. Over 1,000 went missing and nearly 20,000 were injured.  Winds reached  in one–minute sustained and may have been the strongest storm in history in terms of wind speeds as wind speeds before the 1970s were too high to record.

Typhoon Angela (Rosing, 1995) 
Back in 1995, where Typhoon Angela, known as Rosing was an extremely catastrophic category 5 typhoon that made landfall in Catanduanes and made across Manila. Winds reached 290 km/h (180 mph) on one-minute sustain winds. Rosing took 936 lives and the most powerful typhoon that ever hit Metro Manila.

Typhoon Bopha (Pablo, 2012) 
On late December 3, 2012, Typhoon Bopha or known as Pablo made landfall on Eastern Mindanao, damage was over US$1.04 billion by winds of 280 km/h (175 mph) on one-minute sustain winds. Typhoon Bopha was the most powerful typhoon ever hit Mindanao, killing 1,067 people and 834 people were missing. Most of the damage was caused by rushing storm surges and screaming winds.

Typhoon Megi (Juan, 2010)
Typhoon Megi (2010) was the strongest storm ever to make landfall in the country in terms of pressure.

It reached wind speeds of 295 km/h (185 mph) on one-minute sustained winds, killing 67 people and costing over US$700 million in damage.

Climate types  

There are four recognized climate types in the Philippines, and they are based on the distribution of rainfall (See the Philippine Climate Map at the top).  They are described as follows:

Temperature 
Elevation factors significantly in the variation of temperature in the Philippines. In 1915, a one-year study was conducted by William H. Brown of the Philippine Journal of Science on top of Mount Banahaw at  elevation.

Humidity 
Relative humidity is high in the Philippines. A high amount of moisture or vapor in the air makes hot temperatures feel hotter. This quantity of moisture is due to different factors – the extraordinary evaporation from the seas that surrounds the country on all sides, to the different prevailing winds in the different seasons of the year, and finally, to the abundant rains so common in a tropical country. The first may be considered as general causes of the great humidity, which is generally observed in all the islands throughout the year. The last two may influence the different degree of humidity for the different months of the year and for the different regions of the archipelago.

Seasons 
The climate of the country is divided into two main seasons: 
 the rainy season, from June to the early part of October; 
 the dry season, from the later part of October to May. The dry season may be subdivided further into (a) the cool dry season, from the later part of October to February; and (b) the hot dry season, from March to May. The months of April and May, the hot and dry months when schools are on their long break between academic years, is referred to as summer while in most of the northern hemisphere those months are part of spring.

Climate change

Notes

References

Sources 

 

 

 

 
Geography of the Philippines